"D'abord, c'est quoi l'amour" (meaning "At First, What's Love?") is the sixth single from Celine Dion's album Incognito, released on 3 October 1988 in Quebec, Canada.

"D'abord, c'est quoi l'amour" topped the Quebec chart for two weeks. It entered the chart on 17 October 1988 and stayed there twenty four weeks. The B-side of the single included the 1988 Eurovision Song Contest winner - "Ne partez pas sans moi", an unreleased track in Canada.

Track listings and formats
Canadian 7" single
"D'abord, c'est quoi l'amour" – 4:05
"Ne partez pas sans moi" – 3:07

Charts

References

External links

1987 songs
1988 singles
CBS Records singles
Celine Dion songs
French-language songs
Songs written by Eddy Marnay